Peren may refer to:
 Peren (town), a town in Nagaland, India
 Peren district
 Peren Assembly constituency
 Old Peren
 New Peren
 Geoffrey Peren, agricultural scientist and military officer
 , German economist, co-creator of the Peren–Clement index
 , German screenwriter and film director

See also 
 Perren
 Perin (disambiguation)
 Paren (disambiguation)